Paramesochridae is a family of copepods belonging to the order Harpacticoida.

Genera
Diarthrodellinae Huys, 1987

Paramesochrinae Lang, 1944

Incertae sedis

References

Copepods